New Zealand Association for Research in Education (NZARE) was
established in December 1979 and its membership consists of individuals and organisations with an interest in educational research. The current president is Professor Colin Gibbs, Head of the School of Education at Auckland University of Technology.

National/international organisation
NZARE has established formal international links with the British Educational Research Association, American Association for Research in Education, the Canadian Society for the Study of Education and Australian Educational Research Association.

NZARE organises an annual conferences and occasional seminars and workshops where participants share research and engage debate.

NZARE's newsletter is Input (He Pātaka Tuku Kōrero ).

NZARE has established caucuses to promote and serve the interests of Māori, Pasifika researchers and emerging researchers;  Special Interest Groups are formed at the request of members in a range of topics.

Education International
Educational organisations based in New Zealand
Royal Society of New Zealand